Longfin eel may refer to:

African longfin eel
Celebes longfin eel
Highlands long-finned eel
New Zealand longfin eel
Polynesian longfinned eel
Speckled longfin eel

See also
Short-finned eel